Robert Irvine (born September 5, 1974) is an English born Canadian former soccer player and soccer coach.

Playing career 
Irvine played in 1998 with Albany Alleycats in the USISL D-3 Pro League. Midway through the season he signed with the Toronto Lynx of the USL A-League, and made his debut on July 19, 1998 against Rochester Raging Rhinos. The following season he played with Glen Shields Sun Devils in the Canadian Professional Soccer League. He recorded his first goal on June 6, 1999 against London City.

In 1999, he played in the World Indoor Soccer League with Sacramento Knights.

International career 
He made his debut for the Canada men's national under-17 soccer team on March 25, 1991 against Netherlands Antilles.

Managerial career 
Irvine was named the head coach for Kean University in 2014. In 2016, he served as the head coach for La Salle Explorers men's soccer. On July 16, 2021 he resigned as head coach for La Salle, and was named the talent identification manager for the East Coast for the United States Soccer Federation.

References 

1974 births
Living people
Albany Alleycats players
Association football midfielders
Canadian Soccer League (1998–present) players
Canadian soccer coaches
Canadian soccer players
Footballers from Leeds
La Salle Explorers men's soccer coaches
Syracuse Orange men's soccer players
Toronto Lynx players
USL Second Division players
A-League (1995–2004) players
York Region Shooters players
Sacramento Knights (WISL) players
World Indoor Soccer League players